provisional designation , is a sub-kilometer asteroid, classified as near-Earth object and potentially hazardous asteroid of the Apollo group, that had a low but non-zero probability of impacting Earth on 31 October 2041. The asteroid was discovered on 20 September 2006, by astronomers of the Catalina Sky Survey, using a dedicated 0.68-meter telescope at Mount Lemmon Observatory in Arizona, United States.

Description 

Originally listed with a Torino Scale hazard rating of 0, this was raised to a rating of 1 on 22 December 2006 as a result of additional observations and refinement of the orbital calculations. However, on 9 January 2007 it was returned to a rating of 0. It was removed from the Sentry Risk Table on 7 February 2007.

It is now known that the asteroid will not make a close approach to the Earth in 2041. On 31 October 2041, the asteroid will be  from the Earth. 
 passed  from asteroid 87 Sylvia on 20 June 1969. It is also a Mars-crosser asteroid.

Physical characteristics 

According to the survey carried out by the NEOWISE mission of NASA's Wide-field Infrared Survey Explorer,  measures 418 meters in diameter and its surface has an albedo of 0.154.

References

External links 
 Asteroid Lightcurve Database (LCDB), query form (info )
 
 
 

417634
417634
417634
417634
20061211